Lagotek was a privately held company specializing in home automation. It was founded in 2005 by four former Microsoft employees and it is located in Bellevue, WA. Lagotek developed Home Intelligence Platform (HIP) technology. The 4 founders of  Lagotek are Eugene Luskin, Alex Grach, David Kizhnerman and Lev Tcherkachine,

Lagotek officially ceased operations in 2011.

HIP

 HIP is a wireless home automation system that allows homeowners a complete control of lighting, temperature, entertainment, surveillance, security, irrigation and other home appliances in any room from any location of their home
 based on any number of touch-screen controllers, mounted into a standard 2-gang switch boxes of a new or a remodel home; these controllers communicate through Wi-Fi with Z-Wave power outlets, dimmers, switches and other devices; each controller acts as a server, enhancing the system's reliability, while devices also act as repeaters, increasing the systems range to infinite
 Software running on top of Microsoft Windows CE system
Systems controlled by Lagotek

Current software applications for the HIP platform from Lagotek and its partners include:
  Climate control with multiple zones of heating and air conditioning 
  Lighting
  Intercom
  Distributed audio
  Video Surveillance 
  Irrigation
  Security
Applications that provide integration and automation are:
  Modes
  Rules

HIP 100 Control Panel Simplicity Rather Than Complexity

The HIP100 touch screen panels from which the users control the functionality of their homes are elegant, but unobtrusive, easily blending with the walls when not used. Due to the wireless nature of the product there is no need to run new wires since the panels fit into the standard 2-gang box replacing the "so 20th century "dumb" dimmers and switches.

Form factors and devices
Lagotek HIP is the distributed system (no single point of failure) that runs on HIP100 touch screen panels, PDAs, PC, UMPC, and Windows Vista MCE. Multiple instances of Lagotek HIP running on various devices throughout the house are fully synchronized and provide unique level of reliability compare to any other Home Automation system where there is only one central controlling device.
Through the support of SideShow technology Lagotek Modes can be controlled from any SideShow device, so no matter where you are and what device you have in your hands you will be able to monitor and control your home.

Remote connection to the Home
From the cell phone:
Lagotek cell phone application (powered by Crayon Interface’s Moshi server) provides both information about the current state of the home and control of the home through Modes. It is possible to see live real time video from the cameras installed in the house, know how many lights are on and where and what is the temperature in the house. Every system in the house can send Alerts to the cell phone.
From the Web browser:
The same functionality that is accessible on the phone is available through the Web interface due to the integration between Lagotek HIP and Microsoft Windows Home Server.

The Target Market and Distribution
The target markets for Lagotek are new home construction and aftermarket remodeling. A network of Certified Installer/Dealers, who install the systems and provide aftermarket service both on an as-needed and post-installation service agreement basis, serves these markets. As a member of CEDIA (Custom Electronic Design & Installation Association), Lagotek is currently adding to its network of Certified Installer/Dealers, and is interviewing and training Certified Installers from the over 6,000 CEDIA installer/dealers

Lagotek touts its technology as an open platform, on top of which other vendors can provide extensions and customizations.

Electronics companies of the United States
Companies based in Bellevue, Washington
Electronics companies established in 2005
Home automation companies
American companies established in 2005